The Saline County Courthouse in Benton, Arkansas is the county courthouse of Saline County. Built in 1901, the courthouse was the third built in the county. Architect Charles L. Thompson designed the building in the Romanesque Revival style, an uncommon design choice in Arkansas. The two-story brick building features a four-story clock tower at one corner, smaller towers at the other three corners, dentillated cornices, and rounded arch entrances. The courthouse has served as Saline County's seat of government since its construction.

The building features a mural, The Bauxite Mine, painted in 1942 by San Antonio, Texas, artist Julius Woeltz. The building was listed on the National Register of Historic Places in 1976.

References

Courthouses on the National Register of Historic Places in Arkansas
Government buildings completed in 1901
Clock towers in Arkansas
Buildings and structures in Saline County, Arkansas
County courthouses in Arkansas
Romanesque Revival architecture in Arkansas
National Register of Historic Places in Saline County, Arkansas
Benton, Arkansas